Elisa Casanova (born 26 November 1973) was an Italian female water polo player.

She was part of the Italy women's national water polo team at the 2008 and 2012 Summer Olympics. She also competed at the 2011 World Aquatics Championships.

References

External links
 Zimbio
 Getty Images
 YouTube

1973 births
Living people
Italian female water polo players
Place of birth missing (living people)
Water polo players at the 2008 Summer Olympics
Water polo players at the 2012 Summer Olympics
Olympic water polo players of Italy
21st-century Italian women